Two Chimneys Wines is the first and only winery in Norfolk Island.   Established by Rod and Noelene McAlpine in 2006, it has a homestead, a tasting room with wood fire and wide, covered verandas, and a vineyard with eight varieties of grape.  Its first vines were planted in 2003.

See also
Australian wine

References

External links
Two Chimneys Wines – official site
Not Quite Nigella: The Secrets of Norfolk Island – includes a description of a visit to the winery

Buildings and structures in Norfolk Island
Norfolk Island culture
Wineries of Australia
Food and drink companies established in 2006
Companies based in Norfolk Island
Australian companies established in 2006